Leporacanthicus is a genus of suckermouth armored catfishes native to South America.

Species 
There are currently four recognized species in this genus:
 Leporacanthicus galaxias Isbrücker & Nijssen, 1989
 Leporacanthicus heterodon Isbrücker & Nijssen, 1989
 Leporacanthicus joselimai Isbrücker & Nijssen, 1989
 Leporacanthicus triactis Isbrücker, Nijssen & Nico, 1992

Distribution
The genus has been reported from the upper Orinoco, the eastern, north-flowing Amazon tributaries, and the Tocantins River.

Description
Leporacanthicus species have large teeth in the upper jaw; usually there are only two teeth on each premaxilla, the inner teeth very long. Species of Leporacanthicus are medium-sized loricariids with a narrow, pointed head, round lower lip, and fleshy tentacles on the upper lip.  The colour pattern is generally dark gray to black with white to golden spots or a light gray with medium-sized black spots. The abdomen is naked (scaleless and unplated). The caudal fin is straight and angled posteroventrally. L. galaxias are basic black with many white spots. L. triactis are brown, gray, or charcoal black, save for vivid orange or yellow blotches on the spines of the non-paired fins.

It has been hypothesized that the enlarged teeth of the upper jaw are used to remove snails from their shells. This has been observed in L. joselimai, but specimens from Venezuela seem to have a lot of caddis flies as well as freshwater sponges in the gut.

In the aquarium
Leporacanthicus are called vampire plecostomus in the aquarium literature in reference to their large teeth that are characteristic of the genus. These species should be fed invertebrate matter such as mollusks or crustaceans; however, they will accept other foods as well. These fish are territorial species. L. galaxias originates from oxygen-rich environments and should be provided with such a habitat in the aquarium. This fish is not often seen during the day. Breeding has been accomplished for L. galaxias but not documented.

References

Ancistrini
Fish of South America
Fish of the Amazon basin
Fish of Brazil
Fish of Venezuela
Catfish genera
Taxa named by Isaäc J. H. Isbrücker
Taxa named by Han Nijssen
Freshwater fish genera